Godugurayi is a village in Y. Ramavaram Mandal, East Godavari district in the state of Andhra Pradesh in India.

Demographics 
, the village had a population of 223, of which 105 were male and 118 were female, and 17% were below 6 years of age. The literacy rate of the village is 46%.

References 

Villages in Y. Ramavaram mandal